The Lavalle House (also known as the Charles Lavalle House) is a historic house located at 203 East Church Street in Pensacola, Florida. Built in 1805, the Charles Lavalle House is part of Historic Pensacola Village, and features a French Creole period style. It is one of the oldest houses in Pensacola and one of the few structures that remain from Spanish Florida.

On March 11, 1971, it was added to the U.S. National Register of Historic Places for its Gulf Coast architectural style.

History 
Charles Lavalle, a builder and property owner, owned the property from 1803 to 1815. In 1854, when Lavalle died, he owned 25 different properties. In 1968, the Historic Pensacola Preservation Board moved the house to prevent its demolition.

References

External links
Historic Pensacola Village: Photo Tour of the 1805 Lavalle House

Houses on the National Register of Historic Places in Florida
Museums in Pensacola, Florida
National Register of Historic Places in Escambia County, Florida
Historic house museums in Florida
Historic Pensacola Village
Houses in Escambia County, Florida
1805 establishments in the Spanish Empire
Houses completed in 1805